Málaháttr is a poetic metre in Old Norse poetry, which is usually described as "conversational style." It is similar to fornyrðislag except that there are more syllables in a line; usually five.

Poems with verses in this metre:
 Atlamál (the only eddic poem composed entirely in Málaháttr)
 Atlakviða (partly)
 Hárbarðsljóð (partly)
 Hávamál (partly)
 Hrafnsmál

References
Carmina Scaldica

Old Norse poetry